Onkar Nath  or  Onkarnath  is an Indian name and may refer to

Onkar Nath, Indian politician.
Onkar Nath Srivastava, Indian material physicist.
Onkarnath Baranwal, Indian politician
Onkarnath Thakur, Indian singer.
Jeevan (actor),born as Omkar Nath Dhar.